The Dubuque Star Brewery, located in Dubuque, Iowa, is a building that for many years made Dubuque Star beers.  The brewery is located just north of the Ice Harbor in Dubuque.

It was listed on the National Register of Historic Places in 2007.

History
Dubuque Star was established by Joseph Rhomberg in 1898.  Until the beginning of Prohibition, the brewery produced Dubuque Star beer.  As with many other breweries, the Dubuque Star brewery was forced to close down.  Before Prohibition, there were 138 breweries in the state, but afterwards Dubuque Star was the only small brewery left in the state.

With the repeal of Prohibition in 1933, the brewery was reopened.  Because of its location near the Mississippi River, when the river flooded it would often cause problems for the brewery.  The 1965 floods were particularly bad.  The brewery operators made protective measures for the river reaching 23 feet, but the river soon reached 26 feet.  This caused serious damage to the lower floors of the building, and the production equipment.

In 1971, Joseph Pickett purchased the brewery.  He found that the brewery was not in good shape.  Most of the equipment was outdated 1930s era equipment.  The brewery had very low market share.  Pickett began a massive renovation and modernization of the brewery.

Pickett introduced Pickett's Premium beer, which by the late 1970s accounted for about 12% of sales in the region.  The hospitality room was featured in the movie F.I.S.T., as well as the 1981 comedy Take This Job and Shove It.

Agri Industries purchased the brewery in 1980.  They produced Rhomberg Beer until 1985.  The beers made by the brewery were technically superior products, but the company had a limited advertising budget, which resulted in limited public exposure.  The efforts were not successful, and the brewery closed in 1985.  There were a couple more attempts in the following years to reopen the brewery.  However, despite making superior products, the efforts were again not successful, and the brewery was closed down in 1999.

Between 1988 and 1998 or thereabout, the brewery was operated by Zele Brewing Company management. A number of contract brewing were made and the brewery showed promise. However, this was a period when large breweries choked distribution and forced their distributors to abandon micro breweries or craft beers, "shake out period." This shake out period lasted between 1996 and 2003. During this period, Erlanger Beer Brand was owned by Stroh's and it was a licensed product. It also brewed a private label for TGIF chain which increased its production to about 25,000 barrels or more a year. It also brewed under joint ventures for Tuan Chau Tien, his brands. (www.paleale.com and www.beerguy.com)

The city of Dubuque acquired the building through eminent domain proceedings as part of the riverfront renovation efforts.  Work began to renovate the brewery.  Madison, Wisconsin based Alexander Company was brought in to redevelop the site, however they were unable to bring any tenants in for the brewery.

On March 23, 2006, it was announced that Stone Cliff Winery had signed an agreement with Port of Dubuque LLC to lease part of the brewery.  This lease was contingent on the city and Port of Dubuque signing a development deal.  Under the lease, Stone Cliff Winery leased 10,000 feet of the ground floor for an expanded winery and tasting center - which they opened in the summer of 2007. The Dubuque Star brewing company is owned and operated by Jeffery Monroe in Iowa City, Iowa.

In April, 2011, Ruhl&Ruhl Realtors moved into the 3rd floor of the building.

As of 02/18/2013 The Star Restaurant, which was on the 2nd floor, is closed.

In 2014 Eagle Point Software moved into the 2nd floor of the building.

See also
 List of defunct breweries in the United States

References

External links
History of the Jos Pickett Brewing Company 

National Register of Historic Places in Dubuque, Iowa
Industrial buildings and structures on the National Register of Historic Places in Iowa
Romanesque Revival architecture in Iowa
Industrial buildings completed in 1899
Buildings and structures in Dubuque, Iowa
Economy of Dubuque, Iowa
1898 establishments in Iowa
Defunct brewery companies of the United States